The Pacific Southwest Hockey League was a semi-professional ice hockey league that operated in California, Nevada and Alaska starting in 1972 and ran through 1995, when its members were incorporated into the upstart professional West Coast Hockey League. The league operated as the California-Nevada Hockey League from 1968 to 1972.

The League's focus
The PSHL's signature franchise was the Fresno Falcons largely due to convenience and the availability of a then-relatively new showcase arena, Selland Arena in Fresno's Convention Center.  At times throughout the league's history, some games even if not involving the Falcons were held at Selland Arena.

A PSHL season ranged from 15 to 30 games each between anywhere from 4 to 8 teams.  Franchises shifted frequently, often with new teams appearing the next season from the same cities.  The mainstays of the league were the Fresno Falcons, the Los Angeles Bruins and later in the league's history, the Burbank or Los Angeles Jets and the West Covina or California Blackhawks (later just Hawks).

Fighting was also a signature of the league.  Games of the day celebrated the rowdy spirit of the Broad Street Bullies era of hockey.  Most PSHL cities were not traditional hockey markets, and the relaxed atmosphere which allowed a little more leeway to fight attracted an audience that might not otherwise have attended PSHL games.

PSHL games were often paired with side attractions when it came to teams' marketing, including broomball and Roller Derby.

Players
The PSHL's players often were unpaid, not uncommon in semi-professional hockey.

Many had professional hockey experience, with perhaps the most notable being Willie O'Ree, celebrated as the first black NHL player.  O'Ree finished his playing days with the PSHL's San Diego Sharks in 1978–79.

Player/coaches were a common occurrence in the PSHL, and many players also played in other professional, amateur, or even senior leagues at the same time as their PSHL tenure.

1980-1994 - Changes and Uncertainty
The PSHL continued into the 1980s and 90s largely unchanged, though events that were unusual began to periodically indicate instability.

The 1980–81 season saw the entire league schedule moved up two weeks, just six games into the season, as the Reno Gamblers franchise folded abruptly amid financial concerns.  It was the Gamblers' first season in the league, and the league's remaining schedule was hurriedly filled out by league officials in order to still play 18 games per team.  Players from the Gamblers were disbursed amongst the other teams in the league simply by each player being deemed a free agent.

1990 saw several noted Fresno Falcons players, including top scorer Hank Taylor, leave the team and join an upstart Cal-Nev Senior Hockey League team known as the Fresno Aces.  The Aces played two seasons in Fresno's Icelandia ice rink before folding.  Only one of the departed players, Bob Barlow, would return to the Falcons.

A May 1994 game between the Fresno Falcons and Bay Area Leafs would feature a bench clearing brawl resulting in injuries to several players and one linesman in the final minutes of the second period.  After nearly an hour of delays, the game continued with only a few players left on the Leafs bench.  The Leafs suspended operations the next day.

The Fresno Falcons' longtime ownership group of Byron Wallace and Al Geller sold the team in 1994.  A new coach, John Olver, took over the daily operations, and implemented a number of changes which would lead to the folding of the PSHL into the new, professional, West Coast Hockey League.

PSHL teams through the years
Some of the teams that participated in the PSHL throughout the years include:

Fresno Falcons
Los Angeles Bruins
Los Angeles/Burbank/Lake Arrowhead Jets
San Diego Surf
West Covina/California Eagles
Los Angeles/California Blackhawks/Hawks
Bay Area Leafs
Reno Renegades
Reno Gamblers
Alaska Gold Kings
California Hawks
Anchorage Aces
Bakersfield Oilers
Las Vegas Aces
Vancouver Thunderbirds
Orange County Outlaws
Las Vegas Gamblers
Riverside Broncos
Bay Harbor Condors
Golden State Condors
San Diego Sharks (1975–1978)
Lake Arrowhead Sharks
Sacramento Rebels
Culver City Blues
Reno Aces

References
http://www.hockeydb.com/ihdb/stats/leagues/pshl1995.html

Defunct ice hockey leagues in the United States
Sports leagues established in 1972
Sports leagues disestablished in 1995
1972 establishments in the United States
1995 disestablishments in the United States